The Rural Municipality of Marriott No. 317 is a rural municipality (RM) in the Canadian province of Saskatchewan within Census Division No. 12 and  Division No. 6.

History 
The RM of Marriott No. 317 incorporated as a rural municipality on December 12, 1910.

Geography

Communities and localities 
The following unincorporated communities are within the RM.

Localities
 Bents
 Malmgren
 Marriott
 Valley Centre

Demographics 

Government 
The RM of Marriott No. 317 is governed by an elected municipal council and an appointed administrator that meets on the second Tuesday of every month. The reeve of the RM is Orville Minish while its administrator is Jill Palichuk. The RM's office is located in Rosetown.

See also 
List of rural municipalities in Saskatchewan

Notes

References 

M